Leeuwin-Naturaliste National Park is a national park in the South West region of Western Australia,  south of Perth.
It is named after the two locations at either end of the park which have lighthouses, Cape Leeuwin and Cape Naturaliste.
It is located in the Augusta-Margaret River and Busselton council areas, and is claimed to have the highest visiting numbers of any national park in Western Australia. The park received 2.33 million visitors through 2008–2009.

Description
The park extends over 100 miles, from Cape Naturaliste in the north to Cape Leeuwin in the south. It is composed of 28 separate reserves, which together have an area of about 15,600 ha. Despite the park's large size, the reserves are fragmented, and in many places the park consists only of a narrow coastal strip.

It has many features of interest including limestone and granite outcrops like Sugarloaf Rock and Canal Rocks. The coastal area also contains many beaches with well-known surf breaks, such as Supertubes, Yallingup Beach, and Smiths Beach. Other coastal features include coastal cliffs and aeolian dunes. The park has a network of caves, some of which are accessible by the public. There are brackish and freshwater lakes and springs, and the park is crossed by several creeks and rivers, including the Margaret River.

The park either passes through or contains historic sites including the Cape Leeuwin water wheel.

Leeuwin–Naturaliste Ridge
Leeuwin-Naturaliste Ridge runs north and south parallel to the coast from Cape Naturaliste to Cape Leeuwin. The ridge is composed of two landform elements. The Leeuwin-Naturaliste Coast is a discontinuous strip of coastal dune limestone known as the Tamala Limestone Formation, which extends along the western shore. The Tamala Limestone is karstified, with numerous caverns and groundwater systems, including the Jewel Caves and Devil's Lair, which contains the earliest archeological evidence of human habitation in Southwest Australia. The Margaret Plateau extends north–south to the east of the Leeuwin Coast. It is an undulating and dissected plateau, composed of the basement rock on which the Tamala Limestone formed. This basement rock is known as the Leeuwin Complex, a strongly metamorphosed igneous Proterozoic rock made up mostly of granitic and anorthositic gneisses. The Dunsborough Fault forms the eastern boundary of the Leeuwin Complex and Margaret River Plateau, where they adjoin the sedimentary Perth Basin. The ridge's geology and the variations in vegetation are confined to a number of very narrow bands that follow the north–south orientation of the ridge.

Flora and fauna
The park contains a large range of geologic features and soil types. The landscape and soil diversity supports a range of plant communities. These include coastal herblands and grasslands, sedgelands, and heath near the coast. Further inland are shrublands, woodlands, and forests, including peppermint tree (Agonis flexuosa) and Banksia shrubland and woodland, and significant stands of tall karri (Eucalyptus diversicolor) and jarrah (Eucalyptus marginata) forest.

A large variety of bird species inhabit the park including many sea birds, red-eared firetail, white-breasted robin, rock parrot and emu. Native mammals that can be found within the park include southern brown bandicoots, western grey kangaroos, western ringtail possums and brush wallabies.

Conservation
The national park was created from crown lands along the Leeuwin-Naturaliste Ridge at a time after the main primary industries in the region had been dairying and forestry, and when increased land-use conflict was arising from the spread of wineries, increased population on hobby farms and other agricultural activities.

Since then many competing land uses have created a complex land management scenario for state and local government authorities trying to mediate quite conflicting issues. The national park is located on some of the most vulnerable land in the region.

2021 Bushfire

In December 2021, a bushfire was deliberately lit according to police. The fire destroyed almost 5,500 hectares.

Cape to Cape Track

In 2001, the Department of Environment and Conservation (DEC) opened the Cape to Cape Track, a 135 kilometre walking track along the Leeuwin-Naturaliste ridge.

See also
 List of caves in Western Australia
 Protected areas of Western Australia

References

Notes

Sources
 Bastian, L. V. Minerals and their relationships in the Leeuwin block Leeuwin-Naturaliste National Park  Perth : Government Chemical Laboratories, [1977?]
 Cape to Cape Walk Track – Hamelin Bay to Cape Leeuwin 29 km" Department of Conservation and Environment, Busselton. n.d. pamphlet
 Shaping the Capes: Rocks and landforms of the Leeuwin-Naturaliste Ridge an explanation of the Leeuwin Naturaliste Ridge.
 Orr, Kate. and Frewer, Paul (1988) Leeuwin-Naturaliste National Park Management plan : summary of public submissions, November 1988 Como, W.A : Dept. of Conservation and Land Management.
 Taylor, Neil., Scott, Jane., Thomson-Dans, Carolyn and Banks, Roger.(n.d.)  Feast for the Soul pp. 15–20 of The Best of the South West – Landscope special edition, Kensington, W.A.: Dept. of Conservation and Land Management 
 Western Australian Planning Commission. Statement of planning policy. No. 7, Leeuwin-Naturaliste Ridge Policy. Perth, W.A. : Govt. Printer – in – Western Australian government gazette, Perth, Friday 18 September 1998, No. 189. Special. 5191–5215 p. .
 Western Australian Planning Commission.  Leeuwin-Naturaliste Ridge planning review : issues, opportunities and directions : discussion paper for public comment'' / Western Australian Planning Commission, Shires of Augusta–Margaret River and Busselton. [Perth, W.A.] : The Commission, 1995.

 
National parks of Western Australia
Protected areas established in 1957
1957 establishments in Australia
South West (Western Australia)
Warren bioregion